Olisa Metuh  is a Nigerian lawyer and politician, he was the National Publicity Secretary of the People's Democratic Party from 2012 to 2016.

Early life and career
Chief Olisa Metuh was born at Otolo, Nnewi North, in Anambra State, southeastern Nigeria.
He obtained a Bachelor of Law degree from the University of Nigeria, Nsukka in Enugu State and was called to the Nigerian bar in 1988.
He began his law career at Olisianunba Chambers, a law firm owned by his father. In 1990, he established a partnership firm called Metuh, Okafor & Associates, where he served as the managing solicitor.
In 1991, he was appointed as the chairman of Legend Properties Limited, a property management firm. 
He later registered as an Investment Adviser with the Securities and Exchange Commission (SEC). 
In 1996, he established a Law Firm, Olisa Metuh and Co, to provide services in legal practice, real estate and share acquisitions.

Political life
He began his political career as the coordinator of the Igbo United Congress. While serving in that capacity, he was also a member of the finance committee of People's National Forum (PNF).
He served as a pioneer member of the national finance committee of the People's Democratic Party.
In November 1999, at the first National Convention of the PDP, he was elected as ex officio member of the National Executive Committee (NEC) of the party. 
He later acted as the secretary of the National Peace and Reconciliatory Committee  of the party for two years.
In 2002, he was appointed as the chairman of the Cross River State Electoral Panel.
He was later appointed as member of the People's Democratic Party constitution review panel.
In 2006, he became the chairman of Abia State electoral panel and also took part in the supervision of all the primaries in Abia State. 
In 2007, he was appointed as national auditor and member of the party's National Working Committee (NWC)
He was later elected as the national vice chairman of the Party for Southeast zone.
He served as the national publicity secretary of the People's Democratic Party between 2013 and 2015 when the party lost federal power to the opposition All Progressives Congress, APC.

Arrest 
On 5 January 2016, Olisa Metuh was arrested by the Economic and Financial Crimes Commission, (EFCC), answering questions regarding some fund (Arms Deal) said to have been traced to his firm.

”From the records, Metuh got over N400 million, he has not said anything because we need the public money to be returned so that it’s going to be used for public good,” Mr. Magu said during a meeting with online media publishers in Lagos.

On 5 February 2018, Olisa Metuh arrived at the Federal high court in Abuja in an ambulance. He  was absent when the case was heard the previous week.

Professional bodies
Member of the Nigerian Bar Association
Member of the International Bar Association
Member of the Association of Business Lawyers of Nigeria.

See also
People's Democratic Party

References

External links
Profile of Chief Olisa Metuh

University of Nigeria alumni
Anambra State politicians
Living people
20th-century Nigerian lawyers
National Working Committee people
Year of birth missing (living people)
Nigerian politicians convicted of crimes